The San Pedro Riparian National Conservation Area (San Pedro Riparian NCA; SPRNCA) contains nearly  of public land in Cochise County, Arizona, between the international border with Mexico and St. David, Arizona.

One of the most important riparian areas in the United States, the San Pedro River runs through the Chihuahuan and Sonoran Desert transition zone in southeastern Arizona. The river's stretch in the southern San Pedro Valley is home to 84 species of mammals, 14 species of fish, 41 species of reptiles and amphibians, and 100 species of breeding birds. It also provides invaluable habitat for 250 species of migrant and wintering birds and contains archaeological sites representing the remains of human occupation from 13,000 years ago.

In addition to protecting the San Pedro River's rare ecosystem for future generations, the BLM also works to stabilize and preserve several historic buildings and structures located throughout much of the San Pedro Riparian NCA, including those of the Fairbank Historic Townsite, the Little Boquillas Ranch and the San Pedro House. The San Pedro House is located along the river to the east of Sierra Vista and is a fully restored historic ranch house dating to the 1930s. It is now used as a visitor center and bookstore for the San Pedro Riparian NCA.

In April 2022, the San Pedro River was named as one of America's most endangered rivers. Later in 2022, environmental protection groups, including the Center for Biological Diversity, the Western Watersheds project and the Sierra Club challenged the BLM’s proposal to expand livestock grazing in the protected area. In a lawsuit, they questioned whether cattle grazing was compatible with protecting against excess erosion and protecting the indigenous wildlife.

Gallery

See also

 Las Cienegas National Conservation Area
 Riparian-zone restoration

References

External links
 

San Pedro Valley (Arizona)
National Conservation Areas of the United States
Protected areas established in 1988
1988 establishments in Arizona
Protected areas of the Sonoran Desert
Protected areas of Cochise County, Arizona